Kate Brophy McGee (born in Arizona) is an American politician and was a Republican member of the Arizona Senate representing District 28 from 2017 to 2021. Brophy McGee previously served in the Arizona House of Representatives.

Education
Brophy McGee graduated from the University of Arizona.

Political positions 
Kate Brophy McGee has described herself as a moderate Republican. After winning re-election in 2018, she emphasized that her political agenda was "moderation." McGee has a 68% lifetime conservative rating from the American Conservative Union, a 54% rating from the fiscally conservative Arizona Chapter of Americans for Prosperity and she has an 86% rating from the socially conservative group, Center for Arizona Policy; she has a 53% grade in 2018 from the National Rifle Association (NRA). Planned Parenthood, which supports abortion rights, gave her a 50% rating while NARAL Pro-Choice America, which also supports abortion rights, gave her a 0% rating. She received a 42% rating, lower than most Democrats but higher than most Republicans, from the Arizona Education Association as well as a 67% rating from the animal rights group, Humane Voters of Arizona, and a 0% from the Sierra Club, an environmentalist advocacy group.

Legislative record 
She was the only Republican who voted with Democrats against requiring that women be asked more questions before having an abortion. McGee also joined Democrats to oppose expanding the voucher system for private schools. She was one of three Republicans who broke with their party joining Democrats to vote against a bill that would have required harsher sentences for undocumented immigrants in court. In 2018, she co-sponsored a bill to ban conversion therapy from being used on minors. In May 2019, she was one of two Republicans in the State Senate who voted against an anti-abortion bill to fund anti-abortion clinics and to prohibit giving referrals to clinics that offer abortion.

According to a study pulled by the Arizona Center for Investigative Reporting, McGee voted with a majority of Democrats 52% of the time, but she still voted more often with her own party.

Elections
2018: McGee won re-election by a slim margin in a tightly contested race.
2012: Redistricted to District 28 with Democratic incumbent Representative Eric Meyer, incumbent Republican Representative Amanda Reeve redistricted from District 6, and with incumbent Democratic Representatives Steve Farley running for Arizona Senate and Bruce Wheeler redistricted to District 10, Brophy McGee and Reeve were unopposed for the August 28, 2012 Republican Primary; Brophy McGee placed first with 17,971 votes, and Representative Reeve placed second. Brophy McGee and Representative Meyer won the four-way November 6, 2012 General election, with Brophy McGee taking the first seat with 46,225 votes and Democratic Representative Meyer taking the second seat ahead of Representative Reeve and Libertarian James Ianuzzo, a perennial candidate who had run for House seats in 2004, 2006, 2008, and 2010.
2010: When Republican Representative Adam Driggs ran for Arizona Senate and left the District 11 seat open, Brophy McGee ran in the five-way August 24, 2010 Republican Primary, placing first with 11,155 votes; in the three-way November 2, 2010 General election, Brophy McGee took the first seat with 32,589 votes, and incumbent Democratic Representative Eric Meyer took the second seat ahead of Republican nominee Eric West.

References

External links
Official page at the Arizona State Legislature
Campaign site
 

Year of birth missing (living people)
Living people
Republican Party members of the Arizona House of Representatives
Politicians from Phoenix, Arizona
University of Arizona alumni
Women state legislators in Arizona
21st-century American politicians
21st-century American women politicians
Republican Party Arizona state senators